The Yeangder Tournament Players Championship is a golf tournament on the Asian Tour. It was played for the first time in September 2010 at the Linkou International Golf and Country Club in Taipei, Taiwan. The purse in 2019 was US$500,000.

Winners

Notes

External links
Coverage on the Asian Tour's official site

Asian Tour events
Golf tournaments in Taiwan